Nilaheri is a village in Salhawas tehsil, Jhajjar district, Haryana, India, forming a part of Rohtak division. Its postal head office is at Salhawas,  distant.

Demographics
As of the 2011 India census, Nilaheri had a population of 2508 in 541 households. Males (1261) constitute 50.27%  of the population and females (1247) 49.72%. Nilaheri has an average literacy (1756) rate of 70.01%, lower than the national average of 74%: male literacy (1001) is 57%, and female literacy (755) is 42.99% of total literates (1756). In Nilaheri, Jhajjar 15.77% of the population is under 6 years of age (277).

Facilities
Nilheri has a Government Senior Secondary School and a primary school. There are also temples dedicated to 
 Lord Krishana,  Lord Hanumaan and  Lord Shiva.
Dada Bhaiya

Adjacent villages
 Bhurawas
 Ladian
 Chandol
 Mundahera
 Kohandrawali
 Bithla
 Dhakla
 Salhawas
 Humayupur
 Birar
 Bhindawas
 Niwada

Adjacent railway station
 Kosli Rewari

References

Villages in Jhajjar district